Misr or MISR may refer to: 
 Misr, the romanized Arabic name for Egypt
 misr, singular of Arabic amsar, which were early Arabic "garrison towns"
 Misr (domain name), a top-level Internet domain name
 Misr, a variant of the AKM assault rifle produced in Egypt
 Misr Station, former name of Ramses Station, the main railroad station of Cairo
 Misr Station, one of two main railroad stations in Alexandria
 Multi-angle Imaging SpectroRadiometer, NASA's remote sensing instrument

See also